The Belgrade-Brooten-Elrosa School District covers about  in the Stearns, Pope, and Kandiyohi counties in Minnesota. There are about 822 students enrolled in the district. The teacher to student ratio is 1:15. This school district covers the towns of Belgrade; Brooten; Elrosa; Greenwald; Regal; Padua; and Sedan.

Elementary school
Located in Brooten, there are 325 students and 27 teachers. The teacher:student ratio is 1:14. The school earned the Blue Ribbon Award by the Department of Education in 2007.

Students per grade
In the Fall of 2019, we have about 150 students attending the JKC Preschool program on a daily basis in Brooten. Our Elementary classes range from 35-60 students per grade on an annual basis. Currently, our K-6 enrollment is about 325.

High school

The 7-12 building is located in Belgrade. In the Fall of 2019, we are expecting just over 300 students and 22 teachers. The teacher:student ratio is 1:14.

Sources Used
Belgrade-brooten-elrosa Elementary School - Brooten, Minnesota/MN - Public School Profile

See also
List of school districts in Minnesota

School districts in Minnesota
Education in Stearns County, Minnesota
Education in Pope County, Minnesota
Education in Kandiyohi County, Minnesota